The Scorched Peanut Bar is an Australian chocolate bar that contains peanuts baked in toffee and covered in chocolate, made in Wollongong, New South Wales by Cooks Confectionery.  It was originally manufactured by Mastercraft, then by Nestlé who later discontinued it.

In October 2019, the Scorched Peanut Bar was re-launched into the market by Cooks Confectionery.

The product was promoted as "The Hard Bar" and was advertised using sexually suggestive and masculine imagery.  One example of this suggestive advertising is a 1980s television commercial involving a rugged looking lumberjack felling and then straddling a tree and unsheathing a Scorched Peanut Bar on his thigh. An attractive female companion arrives and places her hand on the tree he is straddling. The ad attracted criticism and was subsequently replaced with a less controversial one.

References

External links
 Recipe for a homemade version
   Updated May 2011

Australian confectionery
Chocolate bars
Nestlé brands